Belay Zeleke (Amharic: በላይ ዘለቀ, horse name Abba Koster; 1912 – 12 January 1945) was an Ethiopian military commander who led the Arbegnoch resistance movement in Gojjam against the Fascist Italians during the Italian occupation of Ethiopia from 1936 to 1941. He emerged as a brigand leader after his five-year struggle against Italian rule in Ethiopia.

Early life 

Of ethnic Amhara descent Belay Zeleke was born in 1912 in Bechena, Gojjam. His father, Kassa Zeleke Lakew, was a native of Lamcan in Gojjam and his mother, Weyzero Taytu Asna, was a native of Amhara Sayint in  Wollo, Amhara Region. Belay's father was a loyal and close servant of Lij Eyasu, who bestowed him the title of Basha, and is said to have had a considerable number of troops under his command. After the fall of Lij Iyasu, Basha Zeleke first moved to his wife’s residence, in Caqqäta, and later to Lamchan in Gojjam, and there submitted to Ras Hailu Tekle Haymanot

After a while, Zeleke killed a man and refused to submit peacefully to Fitawrari Embiyala, the governor of Bichena. The Fitawrari marched to Lamcan to arrest Zeleke. In the skirmish that followed, Zeleke was killed in Kanto Maryam, and at Bokena his body was hung on a tree for a day in order to intimidate the local people. This event had a huge impact on the young Bälay and his entire family and relatives. Belay with his brother, Ejegu, and his mother left Lamcham for Caqqäta. It was there that Belay mastered his father’s rifle and began his career as a Shifta (bandit), cherishing the idea of avenging the blood of his father.

The invasion of Ethiopia by fascist Italy changed the precarious situation in Gojjam. Belay and his followers, who numbered some 50 at that time, got an opportunity to fight for a good cause and legitimize their rebellion. They tried to mobilize and recruit the local people, both peacefully and forcefully. They ambushed the Italians and attacked them in their fortifications, capturing numerous firearms. Italian attempts to subdue Belay Zeleke through persuasion failed. Belay soon emerged as a prominent patriot leader; between 1937 and 1939 most of the districts in Eastern Gojjam were gradually brought under his; he was communicating with patriots in other regions, particularly with Ras Abebe Aregai in Shewa. It has been documented that Belay and the other patriots fought in over 23 important battles between 1937 and 1941 at various locations including: Abera, Shebel Berenta, Bichena, Caqqata, Debre Werk, Dejen, Dances, Dibisa, Dema, Delanta, Gonga, Gubaya, Garso, Ennabese, Lamcham, Mekane Selam, Melka, Somma, Tiq, Waseda, Wassage and Yage. Belay bestowed traditional titles and military ranks to the patriots and established his own administration. 

As Italy was defeated and Haile Selassie I returned from his exile through Debre Markos on 6 April 1941, Belay reportedly had 40,000–45,000 combatants, who presented themselves in a military parade in front of the emperor, singing war songs and heroic recitals. Haile Selassie was impressed and rewarded Belay with 12,000 Thalers, and then invited him for a private talk. After the liberation, the history of Belay Zeleke was dramatic. He was appointed the governor of Bichina, his home province, with the title of Dejazmach; he was supposed to keep Gojjam's nobility in check. However, Belay was disappointed: several districts that were previously under Belay’s control were given to other noblemen. Belay's adversaries began to disseminate rumours and send reports to Addis Ababa telling that Belay refused to accept government orders and revolted against the imperial administration. Troops from Gojjam, Wello and Shewa were sent to Bichena to arrest him. Belay decided to resist, and, together with his followers, he fortified himself in Somma. After three weeks of heavy fighting, some of his combatants were killed, some wounded, others weakened, and some defected; finally, Belay was arrested, taken to Addis Ababa and sentenced to life imprisonment.

Later it was reported that on the way to Goggam after he attempted to escape from custody with other prisoners, he was brought to court again and was sentenced to death. The emperor confirmed the death penalty, and Belay was publicly hanged, together with two of his brothers, on 12 January 1945 in Addis Ababa. He was 35 when he died; by four wives, he had three daughters (Yerome, Yasawerq and Yashembet) and four sons (Admasu, Gossu, Bahru and Melaku).

Second Italo-Ethiopian War
When Belay learned that Italians had invaded Ethiopia he decided to fight. Within a few days he found a convoy of the Italian army proceeding from Debre Marqos to Bichena, where he ambushed and killed most of them and took their weapons. He was successful in most of his further fighting with the Italians in Gojjam, Wollo and Shewa. As his war activities intensified and his followers increased, many began to address him as Leul Belay and Atse Begulbetu. Belay bestowed upon his followers the traditional titles, such as Qenyazmach, Dejazmach, Fitawrari, and Ras. When his brother, Dejazmach Ejigu, asked him "what title is left for you, as you have given all to your followers?", he replied: "I need no title as my mother had already called me Belay".

In April 1941, the British forces led by General Wingate liberated Debre Marqos from Italian occupation led by Italian Commander Maraventano. By 5 April, the Italians fled to Shoa, the Debre Marqos fell under the control of Ras Hailu Tekle Haymanot who then requested Belay to come to Debra Marqos by offering him his daughter for marriage. Ras Hailu then insisted on meeting Haile Selassie and had a confrontation with the British forces. When Belay arrived in Debre Marqos, General Wingate ordered that he remain outside of the city at gunpoint and Haile Selassie eventually met him.

Rebellion
After the restoration of independence in 1941, Emperor Haile Selassie I gave Belay the title of Dejazmach and appointed him the governor of Bichena. He tried to fill the subordinate position with his past comrades-in-arms, but his superiors wanted to appoint judges and other functionaries themselves. When Belay refused to appoint those proteges, the superior Gojjam officials reported this to the Emperor, alleging that Belay was revolting against the Emperor's government. He did not carry out the order even when Haile Selassie summoned the quarrelling parties to Addis Ababa. The Emperor sent an army to arrest him, but Belay resisted by holding out in a fortress on Somma mountain. After losing many men, the Emperor dispatched a delegation to him with a promise that he would pardon him, but after Belay surrendered, he was tried by a special commission and sentenced to death.

Death 
Belay's death penalty was confirmed by the Emperor, but changed later to life imprisonment. After a few years in prison he made an escape attempt under pressure from Lij Mammo Haile Mikael, an Italian collaborator who was imprisoned in the compound of the Grand Palace with him. They were re-arrested and brought to royal court. Belay was arrested and executed by hanging in Teklehaymanot Square in Addis Ababa along with his brother Ejigu and other rebels on 12 January 1945.

Legacy 
Dejazmach Belay Zeleke is considered by native Ethiopians as a hero. In order to acquiesce the province, after Belay's hanging, the imperial government changed the taxation policy in Gojjam to the pre-war system. The major road and school in Addis Ababa who are named after him are Dejazmach Belay Zeleke Street and Dejazmach Belay Zeleke Secondary School. There is also Belay Zeleke Road in Bahir Dar.

References

1912 births
1945 deaths
20th-century Ethiopian politicians
People from Amhara Region
Ethiopianists
Anti-fascists
20th-century rebels
People executed by Ethiopia by hanging
20th-century executions by Ethiopia
Ethiopian rebels